Berat was the name of the license (patent) which granted their non-Muslim Ottoman bearers, the beratlı, a variety of tax exemptions and access to  European Law. They were also known as "honorary dragomans". The access to European law helped its agents dominate European commerce.

References

Taxation in the Ottoman Empire
Ottoman law
Society of the Ottoman Empire